Potamonautes suprasulcatus is a species of crustacean in the family Potamonautidae. It is found in Malawi, Tanzania, and Zambia. Its natural habitat is rivers.

References

Potamoidea
Freshwater crustaceans of Africa
Arthropods of Malawi
Arthropods of Tanzania
Invertebrates of Zambia
Taxa named by Franz Martin Hilgendorf
Crustaceans described in 1898
Taxonomy articles created by Polbot